Tazeh Kand-e Khan Kandi (also Romanized as Tāzeh Kand-e Khān Kandī) is a village in Gavdul-e Gharbi Rural District, in the Central District of Malekan County, East Azerbaijan Province, Iran. At the 2006 census, its population was 481, in 108 families.

References 

Populated places in Malekan County